Ukshin Hoti was a Kosovo Albanian philosopher and activist. Hoti was a professor of international law and later philosophy at the University of Pristina and founder of UNIKOMB, a political party of Kosovo. Since 1982 he had been arrested several times by Yugoslav authorities. In 1994 he was convicted to five years in the Dubrava prison. In May 1999, when his sentence ended and he was to be released, guards of the prison relocated him. His whereabouts are unknown and many human rights activists consider him dead.

Life 
Ukshin Hoti was born in the village of Krushë e Madhe/Velika Kruša in the Rahovec Municipality at the time part of Italian-occupied Albania. He studied political science at the University of Zagreb and the University of Belgrade and had postgraduate studies at the University of Chicago, Harvard University, and the University of Washington in international relations and political science. From 1975, Hoti taught international law at the University of Pristina and held an administrative position at the parliament of Kosovo.

In 1982 he was sentenced by a Yugoslav court and spent three and a half years in prison for his support to the 1981 protests in Kosovo, although he was not charged with the use or advocacy of violence. In 1983 Amnesty International declared him a prisoner of conscience. On 28 September 1994, he was sentenced to five years in the Dubrava penitentiary for "endangering the constitutional order of Serbia". On 16 May 1999, the day he was to be released, he was last seen alive by three inmates. Rather than be released, he was transferred to the prison of Niš, and from then, he went missing.

Works
 
The Cold War and The Détente (Lufta e ftohtë dhe Detanti)
The Political Philosophy of the Albanian Cause (Filozofia Politike e Çështjes Shqiptare)
Talk through the prison bars (Bisedë përmes hekurash)
His works include the treatise, the Philosophical Politics of the Albanian Cause, published in English in 1998. He was also nominated for the Sakharov Prize in 1998. His brother Afrim, a member of Vetëvendosje was elected a deputy of Kosovo in the Kosovan parliamentary election, 2010.

See also 
Agim Hajrizi
Bardhyl Çaushi
Fehmi Agani
List of people who disappeared

Sources 

1943 births
1990s missing person cases
20th-century Albanian philosophers
21st-century Albanian philosophers
Albanian activists
Albanian nationalists
Amnesty International prisoners of conscience held by Serbia and Montenegro
Amnesty International prisoners of conscience held by Yugoslavia
Faculty of Political Sciences, University of Zagreb alumni
Enforced disappearances
Harvard University alumni
Kosovan prisoners and detainees
Kosovo Albanians
Missing people
Missing person cases in Europe
People from Orahovac
Prisoners and detainees of Serbia and Montenegro
Prisoners and detainees of Yugoslavia
University of Belgrade Faculty of Philosophy alumni
University of Belgrade Faculty of Political Science alumni
University of Chicago alumni
Academic staff of the University of Pristina
University of Washington alumni
Yugoslav academics
Yugoslav people of Albanian descent
Yugoslav prisoners and detainees